Genoplesium confertum, commonly known as the crowded midge orchid, is a small terrestrial orchid endemic to the south-east of Queensland. It has a single thin leaf fused to the flowering stem and up to sixty small, densely crowded, reddish and green flowers and grows in coastal heath.

Description
The flowers are inverted so that the labellum is above the column rather than below it. There is a thick, fleshy callus in the centre of the labellum, covering about half of its surface and extending almost to its tip. Flowering occurs between February and May.

Taxonomy and naming
Genoplesium confertum was first formally described in 1991 by David Jones from a specimen collected near the road to Rainbow Beach in the Great Sandy National Park and the description was published in Australian Orchid Research. In 2002, David Jones and Mark Clements changed the name to Corunastylis conferta but the change is not accepted by the Australian Plant Census. The specific epithet (conferta) is a Latin word meaning "crowded", referring to the crowded flowers in this species.

Distribution and habitat
Genoplesium confertum grows in heath on stabilised sand dunes in coastal districts between Fraser Island and Runaway Bay, including the Great Sandy National Park.

References

confertum
Endemic orchids of Australia
Orchids of Queensland
Plants described in 1991